George Johnson House may refer to:

George Johnson House (Calamus, Iowa), listed on the NRHP in Clinton County, Iowa
George Johnson House (Lexington, Missouri), listed on the NRHP in Missouri